Breezemont, also known as the Gen. C. C. Watts House, is a historic home located at Charleston, West Virginia.  It was built about 1905 for Cornelius Clarkson Watts (1848–1930) an individual who contributed quite significantly to the history of both Kanawha County and the state of West Virginia.  It is located atop Watts Hill overlooking much of Charleston, and is an example of vernacular Neo-Classical architecture.

It was listed on the National Register of Historic Places in 1982.

References

Houses in Charleston, West Virginia
Neoclassical architecture in West Virginia
Houses completed in 1905
Houses on the National Register of Historic Places in West Virginia
National Register of Historic Places in Charleston, West Virginia
1905 establishments in West Virginia